Turn It Up Faggot is the debut album from indie rock group Deerhunter. The album's title refers to a taunt that was shouted at the band during early live shows although the album is also referred to as self-titled. The album's notes dedicate the album to Justin Bosworth, the band's original bassist, who died in 2004.

Lead singer Bradford Cox produced the cover photography, typography and montage for the album. For the album artwork, Cox took a picture of Jared Swilley from the Black Lips, recognizable to some because of the tattoo on his arm.

Track listing

Personnel
Bradford Cox – guitar, vocals, tapes, piano
Moses Archuleta – drums, percussion
Josh Fauver – bass, piano, percussion
Colin Mee – electric guitar, acoustic guitar, percussion
Chris Bishop – recording, mixing

Music videos

References

2005 debut albums
Deerhunter albums
Kranky albums